Complex craters are a type of large impact crater morphology.

Above a certain threshold size, which varies with planetary gravity, the collapse and modification of the transient cavity is much more extensive, and the resulting structure is called a complex crater. The collapse of the transient cavity is driven by gravity, and involves both the uplift of the central region and the inward collapse of the rim.  The central uplift is not the result of elastic rebound which is a process in which a material with elastic strength attempts to return to its original geometry; rather the uplift is a process in which a material with little or no strength attempts to return to a state of gravitational equilibrium.

Complex craters have uplifted centers, and they have typically broad flat shallow crater floors, and terraced walls.  At the largest sizes, one or more exterior or interior rings may appear, and the structure may be labeled an impact basin rather than an impact crater.  Complex-crater morphology on rocky planets appears to follow a regular sequence with increasing size: small complex craters with a central topographic peak are called central-peak craters, for example Tycho; intermediate-sized craters, in which the central peak is replaced by a ring of peaks, are called peak ring craters, for example Schrödinger; and the largest craters contain multiple concentric topographic rings, and are called multi-ringed basins, for example Orientale.  On icy as opposed to rocky bodies, other morphological forms appear which may have central pits rather than central peaks, and at the largest sizes may contain very many concentric rings – Valhalla on Callisto is the type example of the latter.

Complex craters are classified into two groups: central-peak and peak-ring craters. Peak-ring craters have diameters that are larger in than central-peak craters and have a ring of raised massifs which are roughly half the rim-to-rim diameter, instead of a central peak.

Central-peak craters

A central-peak crater is the most basic form of complex crater.

A central peak crater can have a tightly spaced, ring-like arrangement of peaks, thus be a peak ring crater, though the peak is often single.

Central-peak craters can occur in impact craters, via meteorites. An Earthly example is Mistastin crater, in Canada. 

Many central-peak craters have rims that are scalloped, terraced inner walls, and hummocky floors.

When central peaks form
Diameters of craters where complex features form depends on the strength of gravity of the celestial body they occur on. Stronger gravity, such as on Earth compared to the Moon, causes rim collapse in smaller diameter craters.

group of peaks. Lunar craters of diameter greater than about  may have complex, ring-shaped uplifts. If impact features exceed  of diameter, they are called impact basins, not craters.

There are several theories as to why central peak craters form. Such craters are common, on Earth, the Moon, Mars, and Mercury.

Height of central peak relative to crater diameter

On the Moon, heights of central peaks are directly proportional to diameters of craters, which implies that peak height varies with crater-forming energy. There is a similar relationship for terrestrial meteorite craters, and TNT craters whose uplifts originated from rebound.

See also 
 
 
 
 Traces of Catastrophe, 1998 book from Lunar and Planetary Institute - comprehensive reference on impact crater science

References 

Impact craters
Impact geology